Jórunn Viggósdóttir (born 31 December 1957) is an Icelandic alpine skier. She competed in two events at the 1976 Winter Olympics.

References

1957 births
Living people
Icelandic female alpine skiers
Olympic alpine skiers of Iceland
Alpine skiers at the 1976 Winter Olympics
Place of birth missing (living people)
20th-century Icelandic women